Arrowhead Council may be:

Arrowhead Council (Illinois)
Arrowhead Council (Minnesota)
Arrowhead Council (South Dakota)
Arrowhead Council (Texas)
Arrowhead Area Council (California)